Kibouende is one of a number of places in the Republic of Congo with this name.  This one is in Pool District in the southeast.

Transport 

Kibouende is served by a narrow gauge railway station on the main Congo-Ocean Railway.

See also 

 Railway stations in Congo

References 

Populated places in the Republic of the Congo